List of tourist attractions in Lucknow , capital city of Indian state of Uttar Pradesh

Heritage
Imambaras of Lucknow
Bara Imambara
Chhota Imambara
Imambara Shah Najaf
Imambara Ghufran Ma'ab
Rumi Darwaza
Safed Baradari
Husainabad Clock Tower
Dilkusha Kothi
Chhatar Manzil
Qaisar Bagh
Sikandar Bagh
Musa Bagh

Parks
Janeshwar Mishra Park
Ambedkar Memorial Park
Dr. Ram Manohar Lohia Park, Gomti Nagar
Manyawar Shri Kanshiram Ji Green Eco Garden
Nawab Wajid Ali Shah Prani Udyan
 Gomti Riverfront Park
 Gautam Buddha Park
 Botanical Garden, Lucknow

Others
The Residency, Lucknow
National Botanical Research Institute
State Museum Lucknow
La Martiniere Lucknow
Vidhan Bhavan, Lucknow
Chandrika Devi Temple, Lucknow
Church of Epiphany, Lucknow
Kukrail Reserve Forest
Indira Gandhi Planetarium, Lucknow
 Regional Science City, Lucknow
Dewa Sharif

Gallery

References

 
L
L
L